Michael O'Hara may refer to:

Michael O'Hara (volleyball) (1932–2018), American Olympic volleyball player
Michael O'Hara (writer), American screenwriter
Michael D. O'Hara (1910–1978), American jurist
Michael O'Hara (athlete) (born 1996), Jamaican sprinter
 Michael M. O'Hara (born 1959), American educator, author, and historian of theatre